Acantholycosa logunovi is a species of wolf spider only known from the Altai Mountains in Russia.

This species has a body length of up to 9.5 mm. The male is dark brown and covered with whitish hairs. The female is brown with a pale stripe down the middle of the carapace and a pattern of pale rings and spots on the legs.

References

Lycosidae
Spiders described in 2003
Spiders of Russia